Oppland is one of the 19 multi-member constituencies of the Storting, the national legislature of Norway. The constituency was established as Opland in 1921 following the introduction of proportional representation for elections to the Storting.  Its spelling was settled as Oppland in 1950. It consists of the municipalities of Dovre, Etnedal, Gausdal, Gjøvik, Gran, Lesja, Lillehammer, Lom, Nord-Aurdal, Nord-Fron, Nordre Land, Østre Toten, Øyer, Øystre Slidre, Ringebu, Sel, Skjåk, Søndre Land, Sør-Aurdal, Sør-Fron, Vågå, Vang, Vestre Slidre and Vestre Toten in the county of Innlandet. The constituency currently elects five of the 169 members of the Storting using the open party-list proportional representation electoral system. At the 2021 parliamentary election it had 132,383 registered electors.

Electoral system
Oppland currently elects five of the 169 members of the Storting using the open party-list proportional representation electoral system. Constituency seats are allocated by the County Electoral Committee using the Modified Sainte-Laguë method. Compensatory seats (seats at large) are calculated based on the national vote and are allocated by the National Electoral Committee using the Modified Sainte-Laguë method at the constituency level (one for each constituency). Only parties that reach the 4% national threshold compete for compensatory seats.

Election results

Summary

(Excludes compensatory seats. Figures in italics represent joint lists.)

Detailed

2020s

2021
Results of the 2021 parliamentary election held on 13 September 2021:

The following candidates were elected:
Rigmor Aasrud (Ap); Bengt Fasteraune (Sp); Carl I. Hagen (FrP); Kari-Anne Jønnes (H); Rune Støstad (Ap); and Marit Knutsdatter Strand (Sp).

2010s

2017
Results of the 2017 parliamentary election held on 11 September 2017:

The following candidates were elected:
Rigmor Aasrud (Ap); Tore Hagebakken (Ap); Morten Ørsal Johansen (FrP); Ketil Kjenseth (V); Ivar Odnes (Sp); Marit Knutsdatter Strand (Sp); and Olemic Thommessen (H).

2013
Results of the 2013 parliamentary election held on 8 and 9 September 2013:

The following candidates were elected:
Rigmor Aasrud (Ap); Tore Hagebakken (Ap); Stine Renate Håheim (Ap); Morten Ørsal Johansen (FrP); Ketil Kjenseth (V); Olemic Thommessen (H); and Anne Tingelstad Wøien (Sp).

2000s

2009
Results of the 2009 parliamentary election held on 13 and 14 September 2009:

The following candidates were elected:
Rigmor Aasrud (Ap); Tore Hagebakken (Ap); Aksel Hagen (SV); Morten Ørsal Johansen (FrP); Torstein Rudihagen (Ap); Olemic Thommessen (H); and Anne Tingelstad Wøien (Sp).

2005
Results of the 2005 parliamentary election held on 11 and 12 September 2005:

The following candidates were elected:
Berit Brørby (Ap); Inger S. Enger (Sp); Tore Hagebakken (Ap); Espen Johnsen (Ap); Thore A. Nistad (FrP); Torstein Rudihagen (Ap); and Olemic Thommessen (H).

2001
Results of the 2001 parliamentary election held on 9 and 10 September 2001:

The following candidates were elected:
Kjetil Bjørklund (SV); Haakon Blankenborg (Ap); Berit Brørby (Ap); Inger S. Enger (Sp); Thore A. Nistad (FrP); Torstein Rudihagen (Ap); and Olemic Thommessen (H).

1990s

1997
Results of the 1997 parliamentary election held on 15 September 1997:

The following candidates were elected:
Haakon Blankenborg (Ap); Berit Brørby (Ap); Reidun Gravdahl (Ap); Rigmor Kofoed-Larsen (KrF); Thore A. Nistad (FrP); Torstein Rudihagen (Ap); and Marit Tingelstad (Sp).

1993
Results of the 1993 parliamentary election held on 12 and 13 September 1993:

The following candidates were elected:
Syver Berge (Sp); Haakon Blankenborg (Ap); Marie Brenden (Ap); Berit Brørby (Ap); Johan M. Nyland (Ap); Marit Tingelstad (Sp); and Dag C. Weberg (H).

1980s

1989
Results of the 1989 parliamentary election held on 10 and 11 September 1989:

The following candidates were elected:
Syver Berge (Sp); Haakon Blankenborg (Ap); Marie Brenden (Ap); Berit Brørby (Ap); Johan M. Nyland (Ap); Peder I. Ramsrud (FrP); and Dag C. Weberg (H).

1985
Results of the 1985 parliamentary election held on 8 and 9 September 1985:

As the list alliance was not entitled to more seats contesting as an alliance than it was contesting as individual parties, the distribution of seats was as party votes.

The following candidates were elected:
Haakon Blankenborg (Ap); Marie Brenden (Ap); Berit Brørby (Ap); Åge Hovengen (Ap); Harald U. Lied (H); Johan M. Nyland (Ap); and Lars Velsand (Sp).

1981
Results of the 1981 parliamentary election held on 13 and 14 September 1981:

The following candidates were elected:
Liv Andersen (Ap); Haakon Blankenborg (Ap); Åge Hovengen (Ap); Harald U. Lied (H); Kristian Lund (H); Kristine Rusten (Ap); and Lars Velsand (Sp-V).

1970s

1977
Results of the 1977 parliamentary election held on 11 and 12 September 1977:

The following candidates were elected:
Liv Andersen (Ap); Olav Djupvik (KrF); Rolf Furuseth (Ap); Åge Hovengen (Ap); Harald U. Lied (H); Ola O. Røssum (Sp); and Kristine Rusten (Ap).

1973
Results of the 1973 parliamentary election held on 9 and 10 September 1973:

The following candidates were elected:
Liv Andersen (Ap); Bodil Finsveen (Sp-V); Rolf Furuseth (Ap); Harald U. Lied (H); Per Mellesmo (Ap); Ola O. Røssum (Sp-V); and Thorstein Treholt (Ap).

1960s

1969
Results of the 1969 parliamentary election held on 7 and 8 September 1969:

The following candidates were elected:
Liv Andersen (Ap); Rolf Furuseth (Ap); Asbjørn Granheim (Sp); Torger Hovi (Ap); Per Mellesmo (Ap); Ola O. Røssum (Sp); and Thorstein Treholt (Ap).

1965
Results of the 1965 parliamentary election held on 12 and 13 September 1965:

The following candidates were elected:
Einar Hovdhaugen (Sp); Torger Hovi (Ap); Per Mellesmo (Ap); Trygve Owren (H); Oskar Skogly (Ap); Thorstein Treholt (Ap); and Trond Halvorsen Wirstad (Sp).

1961
Results of the 1961 parliamentary election held on 11 September 1961:

The following candidates were elected:
Guttorm Granum (H), 7,558 votes; Einar Hovdhaugen (Sp-V-RF), 20,856 votes; Torger Hovi (Ap), 47,378 votes; Gunnar Kalrasten (Ap), 47,372 votes; Oskar Skogly (Ap), 47,354 votes; Thorstein Treholt (Ap), 47,367 votes; and Trond Halvorsen Wirstad (Sp-V-RF), 20,866 votes.

1950s

1957
Results of the 1957 parliamentary election held on 7 October 1957:

The following candidates were elected:
Guttorm Granum (H); Einar Hovdhaugen (Bp); Gunnar Kalrasten (Ap); Olav Meisdalshagen (Ap); Oskar Skogly (Ap); Thorstein Treholt (Ap); and Trond Halvorsen Wirstad (Bp).

1953
Results of the 1953 parliamentary election held on 12 October 1953:

The following candidates were elected:
Anders Hove (Ap); Gunnar Kalrasten (Ap); Olav Meisdalshagen (Ap); Lars Magnus Moen (Ap); Anton Ryen (Bp); Martin Smeby (Ap); and Trond Halvorsen Wirstad (Bp).

1940s

1949
Results of the 1949 parliamentary election held on 10 October 1949:

The following candidates were elected:
Gunnar Kalrasten (Ap); Olav Meisdalshagen (Ap); Lars Magnus Moen (Ap); Anton Ryen (Bp); Martin Smeby (Ap); and Trond Halvorsen Wirstad (Bp).

1945
Results of the 1945 parliamentary election held on 8 October 1945:

As the list alliance was entitled to more seats contesting as an alliance than it was contesting as individual parties, the distribution of seats was as list alliance votes. The Bp-BV list alliance's additional seat was allocated to the Farmers' Party.

The following candidates were elected:
Ola Torstensen Lyngstad (V-RF); Olav Meisdalshagen (Ap); Lars Magnus Moen (Ap); Arne Rostad (Bp); Anton Ryen (Bp); and Martin Smeby (Ap).

1930s

1936
Results of the 1936 parliamentary election held on 19 October 1936:

As the list alliances were not entitled to more seats contesting as alliances than they were contesting as individual parties, the distribution of seats was as party votes.

The following candidates were elected:
Erling Bjørnson (Bp); Johannes A. Bøe (Ap); Einar Borch (Bp); Olav Meisdalshagen (Ap); Lars Magnus Moen (Ap); and Martin Smeby (Ap).

1933
Results of the 1933 parliamentary election held on 16 October 1933:

As the list alliance was not entitled to more seats contesting as an alliance than it was contesting as individual parties, the distribution of seats was as party votes.

The following candidates were elected:
Erling Bjørnson (Bp); Johannes A. Bøe (Ap); Alf Mjøen (RF); Lars Magnus Moen (Ap); Kristian Ørud (Bp); and Martin Smeby (Ap).

1930
Results of the 1930 parliamentary election held on 20 October 1930:

As the list alliance was not entitled to more seats contesting as an alliance than it was contesting as individual parties, the distribution of seats was as party votes.

The following candidates were elected:
Johannes A. Bøe (Ap); Alf Mjøen (RF); Lars Magnus Moen (Ap); Kristian Ørud (Bp); Hans Olsen Skurdal (Bp); and Erik Andreas Knutsen Strand (Bp).

1920s

1927
Results of the 1927 parliamentary election held on 17 October 1927:

The following candidates were elected:
Johannes A. Bøe (Ap); Erik Enge (Bp); Alf Mjøen (RF); Lars Magnus Moen (Ap); Kristian Ørud (Bp); and Helge Nilsen Thune (Bp).

1924
Results of the 1924 parliamentary election held on 21 October 1924:

The following candidates were elected:
Johannes A. Bøe (Ap); Einar Borch (Bp); Johan Castberg (RF); Peder Aslak Berntsen Owren (RF); Hans Olsen Skurdal (Bp); and Helge Nilsen Thune (Bp).

1921
Results of the 1921 parliamentary election held on 24 October 1921:

The following candidates were elected:
Einar Borch (L); Ole Martin Lappen (RF); Alf Mjøen (RF); Lars Pedersen (Ap); Hans Olsen Skurdal (L); and Helge Nilsen Thune (L).

Notes

References

Storting constituency
Storting constituencies
Storting constituencies established in 1921